Lecanopteris carnosa is a species of tropical fern in the genus Lecanopteris native to Borneo, Malaysia, the Philippines, Sumatra, and Sulawesi. An epiphyte, its thick, fleshy rhizome forms hollow spaces that act shelter for ants, making this a myrmecophyte, similar to others in this genus.

References

carnosa